Mehdiabad (also Romanized as Mehdīābād) is a village in Chahardangeh Rural District, Chaharbagh District, Savojbolagh County, Alborz Province, Iran. At the 2006 census, its population was 18,234, in 4,661 families.

References 

Populated places in Savojbolagh County